Lobogenesis primitiva is a species of moth of the family Tortricidae. It is found in Ecuador in the provinces of Morona-Santiago and Napo.

The wingspan is 18.5 mm for males and 22.5 mm for females. The base of the forewings is cream, dotted with brown. The remaining parts are brownish with brown suffusions. The hindwings are brown cream, but creamer towards the base and browner on the periphery.

Etymology
The species name refers to the presence of several primitive genital characters.

References

Moths described in 2009
Euliini
Moths of South America
Taxa named by Józef Razowski